Walking Into Mirrors is a 1981 album by Johnny Warman. The single "Screaming Jets" featured Peter Gabriel singing backing vocals and became Warman's best-known hit.

Track listing
All tracks composed by Johnny Warman; except where indicated
"Walking Into Mirrors"
"Radio Active"
"Searchlights"
"Martian Summer"
"Screaming Jets"
"Three Minutes"
"Will You Dance with Me"
"(SOS) Sending Out Signals" (Warman, Jerry Marotta)
"Dancing Dolls"
"Fantastic Light"
"American Machines"
"Automatic Kids"
King Robot"
"Future Fun" (Live)
"Here Come the Reds"
"Golden Lions"

Personnel
Johnny Warman - vocals, acoustic and electric guitar
Tony Levin - bass guitar, fretless bass, Chapman bass stick
John Giblin - bass guitar
Dave Lawson - keyboards, sequencing
Larry Fast - keyboards, synthesizer, effects, electronic cello, bagpipes
Jerry Marotta - drums, percussion
Peter Gabriel - chants and effects on "Screaming Jets"
Technical
Johnny Warman, Vic Coppersmith-Heaven - production, arrangements
Hugh Padgham - engineer
Bob Carlos Clarke, Lindsey Rudland - sleeve design, photography

References

1981 albums
The Rocket Record Company albums